Dye Creek is an  watercourse in Tehama County, California, United States, that is tributary to the Sacramento River. Dye Creek's watershed is situated in north-central California. The Dye Creek watershed contains rugged terrain areas of oak-studded forest, and also provides habitat for numerous understory flora and fauna. An example forb found in the watershed is the poppy Calochortus luteus, which is at its northern limit around the Dye Creek watershed.

Dye Creek was named for Job Dye, an early landowner.

Dye Creek Preserve is a large state holding managed by The Nature Conservancy that encompasses much of the Dye Creek watershed.

See also
 Payne's Creek

Line notes

References
 Victoria M. Edwards. 1995. Dealing in diversity: America's market for nature conservation, page 87
 C. Michael Hogan. 2009. Gold Nuggets: Calochortus luteus, GlobalTwitcher.com, ed. N. Stromberg
 Thomas P. Simon. 1999. Assessing the sustainability and biological integrity of water resources, page 375

See also
List of rivers of California

Rivers of Tehama County, California
Tributaries of the Sacramento River
Rivers of Northern California